The Royal Navy Historic Flight (RNHF) was the historic flight of the Fleet Air Arm of the Royal Navy up until its disbandment in March 2019. The RNHF maintained and flew a small number of aircraft that were important to British Naval aviation. The organisation was not part of the military establishment; it had charitable status and was staffed by civilians. It was based at RNAS Yeovilton and provided aircraft for air displays.

Following its disbandment, the Swordfish Mk.I (W5856), Sea Fury FB.11 (VR930), Sea Hawk FGA.6 (WV908) and Chipmunk T.10 (WK608) were donated to the Fly Navy Heritage Trust at an approximate value of £1,810,000. With the aircraft having now been transferred to the civilian register, displays will be funded from charity events run by the Fly Navy Heritage Trust.

History
The RNHF was established at RNAS Yeovilton in 1972 and became the home for a number of aircraft that had been donated to the Royal Navy over more than a decade. The first aircraft was Fairey Swordfish II LS326, presented in 1960 by Westland Aircraft. In 1971, Hawker Siddeley Aviation presented a Hawker Sea Fury FB.11 and in 1972 a Fairey Firefly AS.5 WB271 was donated. The separate units caring for the three aircraft were merged in 1972, forming the Historic Flight.

Over the following years, the RNHF benefitted further from gifts of aircraft from the German government, Royal Navy and British Aerospace. Technical assistance was also obtained to rebuild and refurbish aircraft. Three aircraft have been lost in accidents, with two fatalities.

In 1995, the ground staff service personnel were replaced by civilian employees but aircrew remained as serving navy pilots who volunteered to spend free time with the RNHF. Air training used the Flight's DHC Chipmunk. The Fly Navy Heritage Trust (Navy Wings), formerly the Swordfish Heritage Trust, a charitable institution to oversee fundraising, made grants to fund the RNHF's staff. The Flight's other sources of income were fees from flying displays, direct donations from the general public and sponsorship from the aerospace industry.

The Royal Navy previously described the role of the historic flight:The RNHF is an educational charity whose mission is to ensure that the unique British Heritage collection of the Royal Navy Historic Flight continue to fly long into the future. Their aim is to preserve the opportunity for future generations to best understand the nature of those who built, maintained, operated and fought in Naval aircraft of the past by experiencing the reality of the sound, smell and the sight of them actually flying. They delight millions with their air displays nationwide and educated future generations.

Aircraft

Gallery

References

External links

 Royal Navy Historic Flight information page at Navy Wings
  Royal Navy Historic Flight Stands Down after 50 Years

Fleet Air Arm
Aircraft preservation
Military aviation museums in England